Alexander Leendert Aronson (20 December 1934 – 15 December 1975) was a Dutch aid worker who was executed in Iraq.

Aronson, who was of Jewish descent, was imprisoned in Bergen-Belsen concentration camp during World War II. After the war, he studied in London to become a nurse. He migrated to Israel in 1955 and traveled the world for six years as an aid worker, before returning to Amsterdam in 1962. He married in 1964 and fathered a son the same year. In the late 1960s, he worked in service of the Red Cross in several countries in Africa and later in India.

From August 1974 onward, he organized aid for the Kurds in northern Iraq. On 25 March 1974, he was arrested by the regime of Saddam Hussein and charged with espionage on behalf of Israel, criminal possession of a weapon and possession of classified documents. The Revolutionary Court found him guilty of these accusations. On 3 November, news broke that Aronson had been hanged, but this proved false. In March 1976, it was announced that he had been executed on 15 December. He was buried on the Jewish cemetery of Muiderberg on 21 May 1976.

References 
Aronson, Alexander Leendert (1934 - 1975), VPRO.nl (in Dutch)
Alex Aronson, Volunteer Medical Worker and Humanitarian, McMaster
From Bergen-Belsen to Baghdad - The letters of Alex Aronson, read online or download for e-reader
Website about Aronson by his son (in Dutch and English)
 Mulder, Robert; Siepe, Lejo De dood in Bagdad: het leven van de Nederlander Lex Aronson, Amsterdam: Arena, 1993. 

1934 births
1975 deaths
Dutch nurses
Dutch people executed abroad
Bergen-Belsen concentration camp survivors
People from Amsterdam
20th-century executions by Iraq
Dutch expatriates in the United Kingdom
Dutch expatriates in Israel
Dutch expatriates in India
Dutch expatriates in Iraq